Laliki  is a village in the administrative district of Gmina Milówka, within Żywiec County, Silesian Voivodeship, in southern Poland.

The village has a population of 1,039. Until 1948 it formed a part of the village Szare known as Szare Gronie.

References

Villages in Żywiec County